Saint-Séverin, Quebec can refer to:

Saint-Séverin, Chaudière-Appalaches, Quebec, a parish in the Chaudière-Appalaches region
Saint-Séverin, Mauricie, Quebec, a parish in the Mauricie region

See also
 Saint-Séverin (disambiguation)